P43, P-43 or P.43 may refer to:

Aviation 
 Paratech P43, a Swiss paraglider
 PZL.43, a Polish light bomber and reconnaissance aircraft
 Republic P-43 Lancer, a fighter aircraft of the United States Army Air Corps

Vessels 
 , a corvette of the Argentine Navy
 , a submarine of the Royal Navy

Other uses 
 Carro Armato P.43, an Italian heavy tank
 GER Class P43, a steam tender locomotive
 P43 route (Belarus), a road connecting to A130 highway (Russia)
 Papyrus 43, a biblical manuscript
 Phosphorus-43, an isotope of phosphorus
 P43, a Latvian state regional road